The World Malayalee Council ( Loka Malayali Parishad) or abbreviated as WMC was formed on July 3, 1995, in New Jersey. It was inaugurated at the first ever World Convention of Non Resident Malayalees. The main objective of this organization is to provide a non-political forum to bring together the widely scattered community of people of Malayalee/Keralite origin and strengthen the common bonds of culture, tradition and way of life. WMC works towards an international brotherhood of Malayalees/people of Kerala origin to bolster their cultural, artistic and social uniqueness and give resilience and understanding towards other cultures with which they have to co-exist and interact.

Organisation
WMC has a three tier organizational structure:-

 a global council
 six regional councils (America, Europe, Africa, Middle East, India, Far East, and Australia)
 local units called Provincial Councils. Membership in WMC is in the provincial councils. Each province serves as the body serving the local Malayalee community.

WMC also has International Forums. The Youth and Women's forum are to be formed in all provinces, which also has a three tier structure.

Global officials 2021-2023

See also

 All India Malayalee Association (AIMA)
http://myaima.org
 Non Resident Keralites Affairs
 Confederation of Tamil Nadu Malayalee Associations
 All Malaysia Malayalee Association
 Federation Of Kerala Association In North America
 Kerala Muslim Cultural Center - KMCC
 India Press Club of North America - IPCNA
http://fomaa.com/

References

External links
 Online registration facility of World Malayalee Council launched
 ALTIUS: Creating leaders for emerging India

Asian-American organizations
Kerala diaspora
Malayali organizations
1995 establishments in New Jersey